The YMCA in East Liverpool, Ohio was built in 1913 in Classical Revival style.  It was listed on the National Register of Historic Places in 1985.

It was one of many properties addressed in a study assessing historic resources in East Liverpool's central business district, a study that resulted in the NRHP listing of several historic districts and buildings (including also Masonic Temple (East Liverpool, Ohio), Elks Club (East Liverpool, Ohio), and Odd Fellows Temple (East Liverpool, Ohio)).

References

Clubhouses on the National Register of Historic Places in Ohio
Neoclassical architecture in Ohio
Buildings and structures completed in 1913
East Liverpool, Ohio
East Liverpool
Buildings and structures in Columbiana County, Ohio
National Register of Historic Places in Columbiana County, Ohio
1913 establishments in Ohio